Tetanops myopina is a species of fly in the family Ulidiidae. It is found in the Palearctic.

References

External links
Images representing  Tetanops myopina at BOLD

myopina
Insects described in 1820
Diptera of Europe
Taxa named by Carl Fredrik Fallén